The Directorate-General for Financial Stability, Financial Services and Capital Markets Union (DG FISMA) is a Directorate-General (DG) of the European Commission. It is one of the thirty three DG's that are created and named to reflect their functions.

The main responsibilities of the Directorate-General FISMA is initiating and implementing EU policy in the area of Banking and Finance, including the Capital Markets Union as well as Corporate reporting and auditing due to operate from 2019.

After the financial crisis that began in 2008, the EU responded with a series of reforms to ensure financial market stability and to enhance the supervision of financial markets.

The operational role of DG FISMA is to ensure that EU legislation is fully implemented, to monitor the effectiveness of these reforms and to respond to any further financial risks that may become apparent.

According to its latest organigram the DG FISMA is organized in five directorates:

Dir A - General affairs
Dir B - Horizontal policies
Dir C - Financial markets
Dir D - Bank, insurance and financial crime
Dir E - Financial systems and crisis management

Mairead McGuinness is the current EU Commissioner for this area since 2020; John Berrigan is the Director-General and he manages DG FISMA.

In the current legislature period (2019-2024) DG FISMA focuses on the achievement of one of the six top European Commission's political priorities, namely "An economy that works for people".

See also
European Commissioner for Financial Stability, Financial Services and the Capital Markets Union
Capital Markets Union
European Coal and Steel Community (EGKS)
Treaty of Rome
Single European Act
World Trade Organization (WTO)

References

External links
DG Financial Stability, Financial Services and Capital Markets Union

Capital markets of Europe
Internal Market and Services
Finance in the European Union